Luiza Machado (born 20 March 1965) is a Brazilian volleyball player. She competed in the women's tournament at the 1984 Summer Olympics.

References

1965 births
Living people
Brazilian women's volleyball players
Olympic volleyball players of Brazil
Volleyball players at the 1984 Summer Olympics
Sportspeople from Belo Horizonte